The 1967 Montana Grizzlies football team represented the University of Montana in the 1967 NCAA College Division football season as a member of the Big Sky Conference (Big Sky). The Grizzlies were led by first-year head coach Jack Swarthout, played their home games at Dornblaser Field, and finished the season with a record of seven wins and three losses (7–3, 2–2 Big Sky, second).

Schedule

References

External links
Montana Grizzlies football – 1967 media guide

Montana
Montana Grizzlies football seasons
Montana Grizzlies football